The Spencerport Central School District is a public school district in western New York State that serves approximately 3500 students in the village of Spencerport, town of Ogden and portions of the towns of Gates, Greece and Parma in Monroe County, with over 800 employees and an operating budget of $60 million (~$14,277 per student).

The average class size is 20 (elementary), 25 (middle-high school) students and the student-teacher ratio is 13:1 (elementary), 12:1 (middle-high school).

Kristin Swann is the Superintendent of Schools.

Board of education
The Board of Education (BOE)  consists of 8 members who serve rotating 3-year terms. Elections are held each May for board members and to vote on the School District Budget.

Current board members are:
Kevin Huntton - President
Greg Kincaid - Vice President
Gary Bracken
Leah Brown

David GibbardoMarco Cancellieri

Schools & Offices

Bernabi Elementary school
Bernabi Elementary School (K-5), Principal - David Caiazza
Named after Leo Bernabi

Canal View Elementary School
Canal View Elementary (K-5), Principal - Carol Robinson

Munn Elementary School
Munn Elementary School (K-5), Principal - Michael M. Canny

Taylor Elementary School
Taylor Elementary School (K-5), Principal - Telcie Pincelli
Named after Terry A. Taylor
Former name: Town Line School

Cosgrove Middle school
Cosgrove Middle School, named after Ada Cosgrove, is the only public middle school in the district.

Wilson High school

Spencerport High School (9-12), Principal - Sean McCabe, Assistant Principals - Steven Lysenko (9th grade and the Spencerport Academy), Amy Sullivan (10th grade), Michael Calzi (11th grade) and Jess Silsby (12th grade)

Administration
The administration building serves as the SCSD main co-ordinating and supervising office. It includes the HR Dept., Technology Assistance Dept., the superintendent's office, etc.

Transportation
The Spencerport Schools transportation department is in charge of getting students to and from home, school, field trips and sports.

See also
Spencerport High School

References

External links

New York State School Boards Association

School districts in New York (state)
Education in Monroe County, New York